Domiziano Arcangeli (June 10, 1966 – July 13, 2020) was an Italian actor, producer and writer best known for low-budget independent, and particularly exploitation, films.

Having worked as a model and stage actor and played small parts in Joe D'Amato's Pomeriggio Caldo (1988), Liliana Cavani's Francesco (1989), Tinto Brass's Paprika (1991), Stelvio Massi's L'urlo della verità (1992) and Enzo Papetti's Beniamino Gad - Alle soglie dell'incubo (1994), Arcangeli relocated from Italy to the United States and was cast in Zalman King's TV series ChromiumBlue.com (2002-2003). He then moved on to darker roles, such as his first American antagonist in the thriller Sin's Kitchen (2004), and worked in several other independent films, like Luigi Desole's The Seer (2007) and Kurando Mitsutake's Samurai Avenger: The Blind Wolf (2009). He appeared in the second season of the TV series Femme Fatales (2012), Giorgio Serafini's action flick Ambushed (2013 a.k.a. Hard Rush), Ivan Zuccon's psychological horror Wrath of the Crows (2013) and Paul Hough's futuristic thriller The Human Race (2014).

In 2009 Arcangeli founded the production company Empire Films, producing and starring in House of Flesh Mannequins (2009), Virus X (2010) and The Ghostmaker (2012 a.k.a. Box of Shadows), both released in the United States by Lionsgate Films, and the comedy Scenes from a Gay Marriage (2012). In 2013, along with his new business partner Aaron Benore, and Jake Barsha of Right Hook Films, Arcangeli co-executive produced the TV miniseries The Bathroom Diaries and starred in Creep Creepersin's feature film The Brides of Sodom.

Selected filmography
 1988: Pomeriggio Caldo (uncredited)
 2009: House of Flesh Mannequins (star and executive producer)
 2009: Samurai Avenger: The Blind Wolf
 2010: Orgy of Blood (star and executive producer) - rereleased in 2016 as Orgy of the Damned
 2010: Virus X (star and executive producer)
 2011: My Name Is A by Anonymous
 2012: Scary or Die
 2012: Box of Shadows a.k.a. The Ghostmaker (actor and executive producer)
 2012: Scenes from a Gay Marriage (actor and executive producer)
 2013: Wrath of the Crows
 2013: The Brides of Sodom (star and executive producer)
 2013: Ambushed

References

External links
 
 
 Empire Films official website

1968 births
Italian male actors
Film people from Venice
Italian film producers
20th-century Italian screenwriters
21st-century Italian screenwriters
Living people
Male actors from Los Angeles
Italian emigrants to the United States
Italian male screenwriters
Actors from Venice